Napoléon is the French form of the Italian given name Napoleone.
Notable people with the name include:

Bonapartes
 Napoléon Bonaparte (Napoleon I), French statesman
 Napoléon Charles Bonaparte (1802–1807), prince of Holland and son of Napoleon I's brother Louis
 Napoléon Louis Bonaparte (1804–1831), King of Holland and son of Napoleon I's brother Louis
 Charles Louis Napoléon Bonaparte, Napoleon III (1808-1873), Emperor of the French and son of Napoleon I's brother Louis 
 Napoléon François Joseph Charles Bonaparte, Napoleon II (1811-1832), son of Napoleon I 
 Napoléon Joseph Charles Paul Bonaparte (1822–1891), son of Napoleon I's brother Jerome
 Napoléon Charles Bonaparte, 5th Prince of Canino (1839–1899), grandson of Napoleon I's brother Lucien

Athletes
 Napoleón Calzado (born 1977), baseball player from Dominican Republic
 Napoleon Einstein (born 1989), Indian cricketer
 Napoleon Harris (born 1979), American football player
 Napoleon Kaufman (born 1973), American football player
 Napoleon Lajoie (1874–1959), American baseball player
 Napoleon McCallum (born 1963), American football player
 Napoleon Amaefule (born 1980), Nigerian footballer

Artists
 Napoleon D'umo (born 1968), American choreographer
 Napoleon Jones-Henderson (born 1943), American weaver and multimedia artist 
 Napoleon Murphy Brock (born 1943), American singer and musician
 Napoleon Orda (1807–1883), Belorussian-Polish musician and artist
 Napoleon Perdis (born 1970), Australian make-up artist

Military officials
 Napoleon Bonaparte Buford (1807–1883), U.S. Army officer and railroad executive
 Napoleon Collins (1814–1875), U.S. Navy admiral
 Napoleon J.T. Dana (1822–1905), U.S. Army officer
 Napoleon Zervas (1891–1957), Greek general
 Napoleone Orsini (1420–1480), Italian warlord

Politicians and other leaders
 Napoleon B. Broward (1857–1910), American governor of Florida
 Napoleon Bonaparte Brown (1834–1910), American businessman and politician
 José Napoleón Duarte (1925–1990), President of El Salvador
 Napoleon Wapasha (1854–1925), Sioux chief
 Napoleone della Torre (died 1278), Italian nobleman, Lord of Milan

Other
 Napoleon Whiting (1910-1984), American actor
 Napoleon Chagnon (1938–2019), American anthropologist
 Napoleone Orsini Frangipani (1263–1342), Italian cardinal
 Napoleon Hill (1883–1970), American personal-success author
 Napoleon LeBrun (1821–1901), American architect
 Napoléon Peyrat (1809–1881), French author and historian
 Napoléon Coste (1805–1883), French guitarist 
 Napoléon Joseph Ney (1803–1857), French politician
 Napoléon La Cécilia (1835–1878), French general
 Napoleone Boni (1863–1927), Italian painter
 Napoleone Nani (1841–1899), Italian painter

Fictional
 Napoleon "Bony" Bonaparte, a character created by Arthur Upfield
 Napoleon Solo, a character from The Man from U.N.C.L.E.
 Napoleone Di Carlo, a detective created by Italian comic book writer Carlo Ambrosini for the series of the same name published by Sergio Bonelli Editore
 Napoleon Dynamite, the protagonist of the film Napoleon Dynamite
 Muffin, a puppy who calls himself "Napoleon" in the Australian film Napoleon
 Napoleon, the bloodhound from the Disney animated film The Aristocats

French masculine given names
Spanish masculine given names